Pictures of Starving Children Sell Records is the debut studio album by British band Chumbawamba, released in 1986 on Agit-Prop Records. It was released as criticism to Band Aid and Live Aid.

Track listing
All songs written and produced by Chumbawamba.

 "How to Get Your Band on Television" - 8:23 (also listed in two parts as "Prelude" and "Slag Aid")
 "British  Colonialism and the BBC" - 2:51
 "Commercial Break" - 1:02
 "Unilever" - 4:23
 "More Whitewashing" - 3:43
 "An Interlude: Beginning to Take It Back" - 2:41
 "Dutiful Servants and Political Masters" - 2:15
 "Coca-Colanisation" - 2:13
 "...And in a Nutshell" - 0:54
 "Invasion" - 5:07

Track details
"How to Get Your Band on Television" critiques Paul McCartney, Freddie Mercury, David Bowie, Mick Jagger, Keith Richards and Cliff Richard's self-promotional techniques, such as Queen's playing in apartheid South Africa. Following a slew of Live Aid-style promotions, sequels and events and the death of Mercury, it was re-written in the 1990s as "Slag Aid", retaining most of the original lyrics. The version released on the live album Showbusiness! also references McCartney, but adds Axl Rose, Michael Jackson and John Lydon as more modern examples.

Personnel
Band Members
 Harry Hamer - drums, vocals, guitar solo on "Slag Aid"
 Alice Nutter - vocals
 Boff Whalley - guitar, vocals, clarinet
 Mavis Dillon - bass, trumpet, french horn, vocals
 Lou Watts - vocals, guitar
 Danbert Nobacon - vocals
 Dunstan Bruce - percussion
Additional Personnel
 Simon "Commonknowledge" Lanzon - keyboards, accordion, vocals
 Neil Ferguson - engineer

References

Chumbawamba albums
1986 debut albums
Concept albums
Agit-Prop Records albums
Southern Records albums